Jaime Humberto Hermosillo Delgado (22 January 1942 – 13 January 2020) was a Mexican film director, often compared to Spain's Pedro Almodóvar.

Born in Aguascalientes, Aguascalientes, in central Mexico, Hermosillo's films often explore the hypocrisy of middle-class Mexican values.

He worked with Gabriel García Márquez on Mary My Dearest (1979) and The Summer of Miss Forbes (1988). His film Homework (1991) was entered into the 17th Moscow International Film Festival where it won a Special Mention.

At the time of his death Hermosillo was teaching film-making at the University of Guadalajara and had recently collaborated with his students on several projects.

On 13 January 2020, Hermosillo died at the age of 77, 9 days before his 78th birthday.

References

External links

Mexican Director page 
Yahoo Biography

1942 births
2020 deaths
Ariel Award winners
Best Director Ariel Award winners
Mexican film directors
Mexican LGBT screenwriters
LGBT film directors
People from Aguascalientes
People from Guadalajara, Jalisco
Mexican male screenwriters
Gay screenwriters
Academic staff of the University of Guadalajara